Ecsenius pulcher, the Gulf blenny, is a species of combtooth blenny in the genus Ecsenius. It is found in the western Indian Ocean. Blennies in this species feed primarily off of plants, including benthic algae and weeds.

References
 Murray, J. A. 1887 (Jan.) [ref. 22438] New species of fish from Kurrachee and the Persian Gulf. Journal of the Bombay Natural History Society v. 2 (pt 1): 47–49.

pulcher
Fish described in 1887
Taxa named by James A. Murray (zoologist)